The 1955 St. Louis Cardinals season was the team's 74th season in St. Louis, Missouri and the 64th season in the National League. The Cardinals went 68–86 during the season and finished seventh in the National League, 30½ games behind the Brooklyn Dodgers.

Outfielder Bill Virdon won the Rookie of the Year Award this year, batting .281, with 17 home runs and 68 RBIs. This was the second consecutive year a Cardinal won the Rookie of the Year Award, with Wally Moon winning the previous season. The Cardinals would have this occur again in 1985 and 1986, with Vince Coleman and Todd Worrell, respectively.

Offseason 
 October 19, 1954: Peanuts Lowrey was released by the Cardinals.
 November 22, 1954: Jim King was drafted from the Cardinals by the Chicago Cubs in the 1954 rule 5 draft.
 November 30, 1954: Benny Valenzuela was drafted by the Cardinals from the Bisbee-Douglas Copper Kings in the 1954 minor league draft.
 December 8, 1954: Ray Jablonski and Gerry Staley were traded by the Cardinals to the Cincinnati Redlegs for Frank Smith.
 Prior to 1955 season: Duke Carmel was signed as an amateur free agent by the Cardinals.

Regular season

Season standings

Record vs. opponents

Notable transactions 
 June 3, 1955: Del Rice was traded by the Cardinals to the Milwaukee Braves for Pete Whisenant.

Roster

Player stats

Batting

Starters by position 
Note: Pos = Position; G = Games played; AB = At bats; H = Hits; Avg. = Batting average; HR = Home runs; RBI = Runs batted in

Other batters 
Note: G = Games played; AB = At bats; H = Hits; Avg. = Batting average; HR = Home runs; RBI = Runs batted in

Pitching

Starting pitchers 
Note: G = Games pitched; IP = Innings pitched; W = Wins; L = Losses; ERA = Earned run average; SO = Strikeouts

Other pitchers 
Note: G = Games pitched; IP = Innings pitched; W = Wins; L = Losses; ERA = Earned run average; SO = Strikeouts

Relief pitchers 
Note: G = Games pitched; W = Wins; L = Losses; SV = Saves; ERA = Earned run average; SO = Strikeouts

Awards and honors 
All-Star Game
Red Schoendienst, second base, starter
Luis Arroyo, reserve
Harvey Haddix, reserve
Stan Musial, reserve

Farm system 

LEAGUE CHAMPIONS: Rochester, Fresno, Paducah, Hamilton; LEAGUE CO-CHAMPIONS: Johnson City

References

External links 
1955 St. Louis Cardinals at Baseball Reference
1955 St. Louis Cardinals team page at www.baseball-almanac.com

St. Louis Cardinals seasons
Saint Louis Cardinals season
1955 in sports in Missouri